RideLondon Classique is a women's cycle stage race held in Essex and London for the UCI Women's World Tour. Part of the RideLondon cycling festival, the race was originally held as a one-day race in central London, and became a stage race in 2022 following the demise of the London–Surrey Classic.

History
First held in 2013, the RideLondon festival was designed as an annual legacy of the London 2012 Olympic and Paralympic Games. The format consists of a series of cycling events on closed roads for amateur cyclists and professionals. The professional men's event - London–Surrey Classic - ran from 2013 to 2019, on a course utilising the Surrey Hills. 

As part of the festival, a professional women's event (originally the RideLondon Grand Prix) was held on a central London circuit, with the finish line on The Mall. In 2016, the race was added to the UCI Women's World Tour, was renamed the RideLondon Classique, and gained an identical €100,000 prize fund to the London–Surrey Classic - making it the richest one-day race in the women's calendar. Due to the flat, short circuit in central London, the race often culminated in a sprint finish on The Mall. Both the 2020 and 2021 editions of the race were cancelled due to the COVID-19 pandemic.

Following the withdrawal of title sponsor Prudential and Surrey County Council, it was announced that RideLondon would become a one-day event in central London from 2022 - with a 3-day elite women's race as the new main event. In March 2021, a 10 year partnership with London Marathon Events to stage the event was agreed, and in November 2021, an agreement with Essex County Council was announced. In February 2022, the full route of the 3 day event was revealed - with 2 stages in Essex and a final circuit stage in central London.

The 2022 event was criticised for not providing live TV coverage for all three stages as required for inclusion in the UCI Women's World Tour - with the UCI warning that the 2023 event would be demoted to the UCI ProSeries if stages were not broadcast on live television. The race retained its World Tour status for 2023 after the organisers provided the UCI with evidence that stages would have the required live TV coverage.

Winners

References

External links
 

UCI Women's World Tour
UCI Women's World Tour races
Recurring sporting events established in 2013
Cycle races in England
2013 establishments in England
Annual events in London
RideLondon